Prince Sotsha Ernest Dlamini (27 May 1940 – 7 February 2017) was Prime Minister of Swaziland from 6 October 1986 to 12 July 1989. He was born in Mankayane. Dlamini died on 7 February 2017, aged 76.

Biography 
Sotsha Dlamini was born in Mankayane. He became prime minister after being appointed by Dzeliwe of Swaziland in 1986. He replaced Bhekimpi Dlamini, who resigned in 1986. Dlamini was prime minister as tensions of apartheid increased. Dlamini died on February 7, 2017, at the age of 76; he collapsed at his home in Mankayane, Swaziland.

References 

1940 births
2017 deaths
Prime Ministers of Eswatini
People from Manzini Region
Deaths from falls